Parliamentary elections were held in Brazil on 15 November 1970. The result was a victory for the National Renewal Alliance Party, which won 223 of the 310 seats in the Chamber of Deputies and 40 of the 46 seats in the Senate. Voter turnout was 77.5% in the Chamber of Deputies election.

Results

Chamber of Deputies

Senate
Each state had two senators, with voters given two votes. In the state of Guanabara, there were two "normal" seats elected for an eight-year term, and an extra seat to complete the term of office of Senator Mario Martins, whose term was revoked by the Military Regime.

References

1970
Brazil
1970 elections in Brazil
November 1970 events in South America